The Roseway Theater was a historic theater in northeast Portland, Oregon's Roseway neighborhood, in the United States, that operated for almost a century. The  independent theater  operated continually from 1925 to 2022, when it was destroyed by fire. Greg Wood had owned the Roseway since 2008.

In the early morning hours of August 6, 2022, an electrical fire started in the theater and the building subsequently sustained significant damage, with more than 80 firefighters called in to pour water through the burned roof and collapsed interior stairwells. Owner Greg Wood decided not to rebuild, but the theater's marquee, which survived the fire, was removed in December 2022 with plans to display it at the National Neon Sign Museum in The Dalles, Oregon.

References

External links
 
 
 Roseway Theatre at Puget Sound Theatre Organ Society

1924 establishments in Oregon
2022 disestablishments in Oregon
Demolished buildings and structures in Portland, Oregon
Roseway, Portland, Oregon
Theatres completed in 1924
Theatres in Portland, Oregon